Peewee (also Pee Wee) is an unincorporated community in southwestern Wirt County, West Virginia, United States.  It lies along local roads southwest of the town of Elizabeth, the county seat of Wirt County.  Its elevation is 679 feet (207 m).  Right Reedy Creek is formed at Peewee by the confluence of Enoch Fork and Fulls Fork.

References

Unincorporated communities in Wirt County, West Virginia
Unincorporated communities in West Virginia